Hold Your Horses is the fifth studio album recorded by American female vocal trio First Choice, released in 1979 on the Gold Mind label.

History
The album features the title track, which peaked at No. 73 on the Hot Soul Singles chart, and "Double Cross", which peaked at No. 60 on the same chart. The album was remastered and reissued with bonus tracks in 2013 by Big Break Records.

Track listing

Personnel
Rochelle Fleming, Annette Guest, Debbie Martin – vocals

Musicland Studios
Keith Forsey – percussion, drums
Les Hurdle – bass
Mats Björklund – guitar
Thor Baldursson – keyboards
Larry Washington – congas
Tom Moulton – tambourine
Munich Philharmonic – strings
Don Renaldo – horns
John Davis – saxophone solo on "Let Me Down Easy

Sigma Sound Studios
Keith Benson – drums
Jimmy Williams – bass
Norman Harris, Bobby Eli, T.J. Tindall – guitars
Eugene "Lambchops" Curry – keyboards
Larry Washington, James Walker – congas
Don Renaldo – strings, horns

Charts

Singles

References

External links
 

1979 albums
First Choice (band) albums
Albums produced by Tom Moulton
Albums produced by Norman Harris
Albums recorded at Sigma Sound Studios
Gold Mind Records albums